The Roman Catholic Diocese of Punto Fijo is a diocese located in the city of Punto Fijo in the Ecclesiastical province of Coro in Venezuela.

History
On 12 July 1997 Pope John Paul II established the Diocese of Punto Fijo from the Diocese of Coro.

Bishops
Juan María Leonardi Villasmil (1997-07-12 – 2014-06-07)
Carlos Alfredo Cabezas Mendoza (2016-06-04 - )

Other priest of this diocese who became bishop
Jesús Tomás Zárraga Colmenares, appointed Bishop of San Carlos de Venezuela in 2003

See also

Roman Catholicism in Venezuela

References

External links
 GCatholic.org
 Catholic Hierarchy 

Roman Catholic dioceses in Venezuela
Roman Catholic Ecclesiastical Province of Coro
Christian organizations established in 1997
Roman Catholic dioceses and prelatures established in the 20th century
1997 establishments in Venezuela
Punto Fijo